Hyannis may refer to:

 Hyannis, Massachusetts, U.S.
 Hyannis Port, Massachusetts, U.S.
 Hyannis, Nebraska, U.S.
 Hyannis (YTB-817), a U.S. Navy Natick-class large harbor tug 1973—1997